Genocide law may refer to:

Genocide Convention, an international genocide law adopted by the United Nations General Assembly in 1948
Treatment of genocide under municipal laws of individual jurisdictions
Genocide Law (Albania), an Albanian law, enacted in 1995 and repealed in 1997

See also
International human rights law